The 2014 Big East Conference men's Futbol season was the second soccer season for the recently realigned Big East Conference. Including the history of the original Big East Conference, this was the 19th season of men's soccer under the "Big East Conference" name.

The defending champions were the Marquette Golden Eagles who defeated the Providence Friars by a score of 3 – 2 in the 2013 Big East Men's Soccer Tournament final. The Creighton Bluejays claimed the 2014 Big East Conference Regular Season Championship after defeating Providence by a score of 3 – 0 on November 7, 2014 and posting a conference record of 7 wins, 1 loss, and 1 tie. The 2014 Big East Men's Soccer Tournament was won by the Providence Friars who defeated the Xavier Musketeers in the Big East final.

Teams

Stadia and locations

Standings

Tournament 

Held from November 11–16, 2014 at PPL Park in Chester, Pennsylvania, the 2014 Big East Men's Soccer Tournament determined the Big East Conference Champion, and the conference's automatic berth into the 2014 NCAA Division I Men's Soccer Championship. Seeding for the tournament is based on regular season conference records. The participating teams according to seed were: #1 Creighton, #2 Xavier, #3 Georgetown, #4 Providence, #5 Villanova, and #6 Marquette. The Tournament was won by Providence who defeated Xavier in the Big East final.

Results 
Sources:

References 

 
2014 NCAA Division I men's soccer season